Samudio may refer to:

Álvaro Cepeda Samudio (1926–1972), Colombian journalist, novelist, short story writer, and filmmaker
Domingo "Sam" Samudio or "Sam the Sham" (born 1937), stage name of American rock and roll singer Domingo "Sam" Zamudio
Juan Samudio (born 1978), Paraguayan footballer
Miguel Samudio (born 1986), Paraguayan footballer
Patrocinio Samudio (1975–2017), Paraguayan footballer

See also
Samuda
Zamudio
Zamudio SD